Premam is a 2015 Indian Malayalam-Tamil languages coming-of-age musical romantic drama film written, edited, and directed by Alphonse Puthren.  It was produced by Anwar Rasheed under his production company, Anwar Rasheed Entertainment. The film features Nivin Pauly and Sai Pallavi in the lead roles. The soundtrack and score were composed by Rajesh Murugesan, while the cinematography was handled by Anand C. Chandran. The plot follows love life of George David (Nivin) from teenage to adulthood in three stages. The film was also remade in Telugu in 2016 with the same name.

Produced on a budget of 40 million, Premam was released on 29 May 2015 and grossed 600 million. The film was included in The Hindu's top 25 Malayalam-language films of the decade. The film garnered awards and nominations in several categories, with particular praise for its direction, screenplay, Nivin and Pallavi's performance, music, cinematography, and editing. The film won 37 awards from 60 nominations.

At the 63rd Filmfare Awards South, Premam was nominated in seven categories, winning Best Female Debut (Sai Pallavi) and Best Male Playback Singer (Vijay Yesudas for "Malare"). At the 5th South Indian International Movie Awards it received fifteen nominations and won seven, including those for Best Film, Best Director, Best Music Director, Best Lyricist, Best Male Playback Singer (Vijay Yesudas). Nivin and Sai Pallavi won the Best Actor Critics and Best Debut Actress awards respectively. At the 1st IIFA Utsavam it received nine nominations and won four, including those for Best Performance in a Comic Role, Best Music Direction, Best Lyricist and Best Male Playback Singer. Among other wins, the film received six Asianet Film Awards, six Vanitha Film Awards, three Asianet Comedy Awards, four Asiavision Awards and two CPC Cine Awards. But the movie was not considered by the Kerala State Film Awards, which is official state film award given by Government of Kerala.

Awards and nominations

Notes

See also 
 List of Malayalam films of 2015

References

External links
 Accolades for Premam at the Internet Movie Database

Lists of accolades by Indian film